Esporte Clube Noroeste, commonly referred to as Noroeste, is a Brazilian professional association football club based in Bauru, São Paulo. The team competes in the Campeonato Paulista Série A2, the second tier of the São Paulo state football league.

Named after a now-defunct railway, Noroeste is a very traditional team within São Paulo state. Their home ground is "Alfredo de Castilho" stadium (supports approximately 18,840 people).

History
Noroeste was founded on September 1, 1910, on the same day as Corinthians, the most popular club in Brazil. The club became professional only in 1948. Before that year, it won the Campeonato do Interior, the most prestigious tournament among São Paulo countryside teams, in 1943.

Ten years later (1953), Noroeste were promoted to Campeonato Paulista (state championship) first division. Until 1966, they played against many of the best teams of the country, including legendary Pelé's Santos. After that year, Noroeste has built a history of promotions and relegations to the 1980s. The club reached Campeonato Brasileiro (national first division) once, in 1978.

The 1990s marked one of the hardest period in Noroeste history. They were relegated to Campeonato Paulista Série A-3 (state third division) twice (1994 and 1999) and come back to Série A-1 (state first division) only in 2005, boosted by the wealth support from chairman Damião Garcia, elected in 2003.

At 2006 season, Noroeste finished Campeonato Paulista in the fourth position, the best in whole club history. They were in Copa do Brasil (Brazil Cup) for the first time, but lost to 15 de Novembro (Campo Bom) yet on early stages. On Série C (national third division), Noroeste reached the third phase, but failed to promote.

2007 season ended with a good general performance for the club, despite first round disqualification in Série C. Noroeste finished 7th on Campeonato Paulista, their third best effort ever. The club was second to Guaratinguetá in Campeonato do Interior and advanced to second round in Copa do Brasil, where runners-up Figueirense defeated them.

The financial struggle when former chairman Damião Garcia ended Kalunga's sponsorship marked the end of an era. A succession of relegation brought the club from First to Last Division of state championship in only 5 years time. In 2015, for the first time in his centennial history, Noroeste played Campeonato Paulista Segunda Divisão, the fourth and last division. Promotion was granted one year later after an irregular season, but enough to qualify among the four best teams. Noroeste has been disputing Campeonato Paulista Série A3 since 2016.

Stadium
Noroeste plays their home matches on Alfredo de Castilho stadium. Today's maximum attendance is of 18,840. Public record was 22,863 in a Campeonato Paulista match against Palmeiras.

Achievements
 Campeonato Paulista Série A2 Winners (4): 1943, 1953, 1970, 1984
 Campeonato Paulista Série A3 Winners (2): 1995, 2022 
 Copa Paulista de Futebol:  (São Paulo State Cup)
 Winners (2): 2005, 2012

Current squad
As of March, 2020

Current staff

Rivals
Noroeste main rivals are Marília and XV de Jaú.

References

External links
 Esporte Clube Noroeste official site

 
Association football clubs established in 1910
Football clubs in São Paulo (state)
1910 establishments in Brazil